Sir Henry "Harry" Letheby Tidy  (28 October 1877 – 3 June 1960) was a British physician and gastroenterologist.

Biography
After education at Winchester College and then at New College, Oxford, he studied medicine at the London Hospital and graduated BM BCh Oxon in 1905. After junior appointments at the London Hospital, he studied at Freiburg and Berlin, and then was appointed demonstrator of clinical pathology at the London Hospital. In 1906 he graduated DM Oxon and also qualified MRCS (Member of the Royal College of Surgeons), LRCP (Licentiate of the Royal College of Physicians). In 1908 he qualified MRCP. In the 1920s he also held appointments to the Poplar Hospital and the Great Northern Hospital.

In WWI he joined the RAMC and attained the rank of major. In 1919 he was appointed an assistant physician to St Thomas' Hospital and was elected FRCP.

His book A Synopsis of Medicine (1920) has a general arrangement that follows Osler's The Principles and Practice of Medicine. Tidy's Synopsis had a 5th edition in 1930 and a 10th edition in 1954. He was the editor of Index of Symptomatology (1928) and the co-editor of The Medical Annual: A Yearbook of Treatment and Practitioners' Index for many years from 1934. He delivered the Lumleian Lectures in 1937. In 1937 he was a co-founder of the British Society of Gastroenterology along with Arthur Frederick Hurst, John Ryle, L. J. Witts, and Lionel Hardy. In 1938 Tidy became dean of St Thomas's Hospital Medical School.

Tidy resigned his Army commission in 1942 and was granted the honorary rank of major-general. From 1942 to 1945 he presided over the Inter-Allied Conferences on War Medicine at the Royal Society of Medicine. He was the editor of the proceedings of the Inter-Allied Conferences on War Medicine published in 1947.

He was knighted in 1943. From 1946 to 1951 during each winter he was a visiting professor at the University of Cairo.

In 1936 the Duke of York appointed him Physician-in-Ordinary to the Household of the Duke of York and then, after becoming King George VI, appointed him an Extra Physician. In 1952 Sir Henry Tidy became Extra Physician to the Queen.

Henry Tidy, whose father was Charles Meymott Tidy, married in 1906 Elizabeth Catherine Ramsay. Her father was the chemist Sir William Ramsay. Henry and Elizabeth Tidy had two sons and one daughter.

He was hon. major-general in the British Army and a member of the Bath Club.

Selected publications

Articles
 
with E. B. Morley: 

 (See Ayerza's disease.)

 (See Bornholm disease.)
 (See Banti's syndrome.)

Books

References 

1877 births
1960 deaths
People educated at Winchester College
Alumni of New College, Oxford
20th-century English medical doctors
British gastroenterologists
Alumni of the London Hospital Medical College
Fellows of the Royal College of Physicians
Physicians of St Thomas' Hospital
Royal Army Medical Corps officers
Knights Bachelor